James Gillespie (c. 1747 – January 11, 1805) was a Democratic-Republican U.S. Congressman from North Carolina between 1793 and 1799.

There is some uncertainty about Gillespie's birthplace. The Dictionary of North Carolina Biography and some family sources state that he was born in County Monaghan, Ireland. The Biographical Dictionary of the United States Congress gives his birthplace as Kenansville, North Carolina.

Gillespie pursued classical studies and served as a captain in the 1st Battalion of Volunteers and the  Duplin County Regiment of the North Carolina militia during the American Revolutionary War. He was a delegate to the state constitutional convention of 1776 and served in the North Carolina House of Commons (1779–1783) from Duplin County, then in the North Carolina Senate (1784–1786), before being elected as a Democratic-Republican to the 4th and 5th U.S. Congresses (March 4, 1793 – March 3, 1799) and later to the 8th United States Congress (March 4, 1803 – January 11, 1805).

He died on January 11, 1805, shortly before completing his term in Congress. He was buried at the Presbyterian Burying Ground in Washington, D.C. By an act of Congress, his remains were removed to Congressional Cemetery in April 1892.  A cenotaph at the cemetery is located at Range 31 Site 58; his remains were buried at Range 60 Site 58 in 1893.

See also
 List of United States Congress members who died in office (1790–1899)

References

1747 births
1805 deaths
Members of the North Carolina House of Representatives
North Carolina state senators
Burials at the Congressional Cemetery
Burials at Presbyterian Burying Ground
Democratic-Republican Party members of the United States House of Representatives from North Carolina
North Carolina militiamen in the American Revolution
Members of the North Carolina Provincial Congresses